The 1971 Rothmans Canadian Open was a tennis tournament played on outdoor clay courts at the Toronto Lawn Tennis Club in Toronto in Canada that was part of the 1971 World Championship Tennis circuit. The tournament was held from August 9 through August 16, 1971. John Newcombe and Françoise Dürr won the singles titles.

Finals

Men's singles
 John Newcombe defeated  Tom Okker 7–6, 3–6, 6–2, 7–6
 It was Newcombe's 10th professional title of the year and the 24th of his career.

Women's singles
 Françoise Dürr defeated  Evonne Goolagong 6–4, 6–2
 It was Durr's 6th title of the year and the 33rd of her career.

Men's doubles
 Tom Okker /  Marty Riessen defeated  Arthur Ashe /  Dennis Ralston 6–3, 6–3, 6–1
 It was Okker's 7th title of the year and the 20th of his career. It was Riessen's 7th title of the year and the 16th of his career.

Women's doubles
 Rosemary Casals /  Françoise Dürr defeated  Lesley Turner Bowrey /  Evonne Goolagong 6–3, 6–2
 It was Casals' 3rd title of the year and the 17th of her career. It was Durr's 7th title of the year and the 34th of her career.

References

External links
 
 Association of Tennis Professionals (ATP) tournament profile
 Women's Tennis Association (WTA) tournament profile

Rothmans Canadian Open
Rothmans Canadian Open
Rothmans Canadian Open
Rothmans Canadian Open
Canadian Open (tennis)